The 2011–12 Kategoria e Parë was the 65th season of a second-tier association football league in Albania.

Teams 
The league was comprised fourteen teams, the teams ranked fifth through twelfth from the 2010–11 season, two relegated teams from the 2010–11 Kategoria Superiore, the two group winners of the 2010–11 Kategoria e Dytë, the two losing teams from the promotion/relegation playoffs between Kategoria e Parë and Kategoria Superiore teams and the two winning teams from the promotion/relegation playoffs between Kategoria e Parë and Kategoria e Dytë teams.

Pogradeci have earned direct promotion to the 2011–12 Kategoria Superiore season. They will be replaced by Elbasani, who were relegated at the end of the 2010–11 Kategoria Superiore season. Three additional directly promoted teams, as well as the other team to be directly relegated from the 2010–11 Kategoria Superiore, are yet to be determined.

Partizani were directly relegated to the 2011–12 Kategoria e Dytë after finishing the 2010–11 Kategoria e Parë season at the bottom of the table. The other team to be directly relegated, as well as both Kategoria e Dytë group winners, which will earn direct promotion, are yet to be determined.

League table

Promotion playoffs
The third-, fourth- and fifth-placed Kategoria e Parë teams competed against the 10th-, 11th- and 12th-placed Kategoria Superiore sides in single match relegation playoffs.

References

2011-12
2
Albania